Igor Pavlovich Belov (born 21 October 1954) is a former Belarusian and Russian professional football player and coach. He made his professional debut in the Soviet Second League in 1972 for FC Neman Grodno.

Honours
 Soviet Top League champion: 1982.

References

1954 births
Living people
Sportspeople from Grodno
Soviet footballers
Belarusian footballers
Russian footballers
Soviet Top League players
Russian Premier League players
FC Neman Grodno players
FC SKA-Khabarovsk players
FC Dinamo Minsk players
FC Dnepr Mogilev players
FC Luch Vladivostok players
Navbahor Namangan players
FC Znamya Truda Orekhovo-Zuyevo players
Belarusian football managers
FC Belshina Bobruisk managers
FC Molodechno managers
Association football defenders